The Man in Black may refer to:

People 
 Johnny Cash (1932–2003), American singer, songwriter, musician, actor, and author
 Dale Earnhardt (1951-2001), American professional stock car driver and team owner
 Valentine Dyall (1908–1985), British actor, the original presenter of the BBC Radio series Appointment with Fear
 Peter Moore (serial killer) (born 1946), British serial killer
 Pietro Tacchi Venturi (1861–1956), papal liaison to Mussolini
 An association football referee, referring to the traditional match official's kit

Entertainment

Music 
 Man in Black (album), a 1971 album by Johnny Cash
 "Man in Black" (song), on the album
 "The Man in Black", a 1974 instrumental by Cozy Powell

Other media 
 The narrator of the BBC Radio series Appointment with Fear
 The Man in Black (film), a 1949 British thriller film
 Man in Black: His Own Story in His Own Words, Johnny Cash's autobiography
 The Man in Black, a 1965 Western novel by Marvin Albert
 The Man in Black, a ballet by James Kudelka
 The Man in Black, a strip in the British comics anthology Spike (DC Thomson)

Fictional characters 
 Chaucer's Man in Black, from The Book of the Duchess
 Man in Black (Lost)
 Man in Black (Westworld)
 Randall Flagg, featured in several of Stephen King's novels
 Dr. Terence Wynn, in the Halloween film series
 Colonel Douglas Mortimer, in the western For a Few Dollars More, played by Lee Van Cleef

See also 

 
 List of people known as the Black
 The Traveller in Black, a collection of stories by John Brunner
 Men in Black (disambiguation)
 MIB (disambiguation)

Lists of people by nickname
Nicknames in music